= Basketball: The Pro Game =

1985 video game

- Developer: Lance Haffner Games
- Publisher: Lance Haffner Games

Basketball: The Pro Game is a video game published by Lance Haffner Games.

== Gameplay ==
Basketball: The Pro Game is a game in which 81 professional basketball teams dating as far back as 1955 are simulated in a text-only game.

== Reception ==
Rick Teverbaugh reviewed Final Four College Basketball and Basketball: The Pro Game for Computer Gaming World, and stated that "Overall, it is a well thought-out pair of games that certainly fills a void in the computer gaming world."
